WSYE (93.3 FM), known as "Sunny 93.3", is a "Bright" adult contemporary radio station with studios in Tupelo, Mississippi.  The station's city of license is Houston, Mississippi.

WSYE is one of only three 100,000-watt radio stations based in and serving North Mississippi and is owned and operated by the Mississippi Radio Group (which owns the only other two 100 kW stations in Northern Mississippi).  Sunny 93.3's signal coverage is the largest of any other station in the region which enables the brand to serve two Arbitron rated markets: Tupelo and Columbus-Starkville-West Point.

The station is the former WCPC-FM. The first broadcast was in October 1990.

External links
Mississippi Radio Group Website

SYE
Radio stations established in 1968
1968 establishments in Mississippi
Mainstream adult contemporary radio stations in the United States